Cryptogramma crispa, the parsley fern, is an Arctic–alpine species of fern.

Description
The fertile leaves have sori scattered along the veins, each with a strongly enrolled false indusium. The sporangia are yellow and mature around midsummer.

Distribution and ecology
Cryptogramma crispa grows among acidic rocks in areas where snow lies until late in the year. It is a pioneer species on stable scree slopes and also occurs on cliffs and dry stone walls.

In Europe, C. crispa has an Arctic–alpine distribution, growing in the mountains of Central and Southern Europe, as well as in the north of the continent, including Scandinavia and higher ground in the British Isles. In Ireland, it is rare and concentrated in the east of the country, leading Praeger to conjecture that the Irish examples are recent colonists from Great Britain, arriving as airborne spores.

Similar plants, which may belong to the same species occur in East Asia and North America, although these are usually considered a separate taxon.

Spores attributable to C. crispa have been discovered in deposits in Snowdonia from the last glacial period, as well as from more low-lying sites in Cheshire.

Taxonomic history
The parsley fern appeared in Carl Linnaeus' 1753 work Species Plantarum, the starting point for botanical nomenclature, under the name Osmunda crispa. The specific epithet crispa means finely waved or curled. It is placed in the family Pteridaceae, part of the order Polypodiales.

References

External links

crispa
Alpine flora
Flora of Europe
Flora of temperate Asia
Plants described in 1753
Taxa named by Carl Linnaeus